Elisabeth Becker (20 July 1923 – 4 July 1946) was a Nazi concentration camp overseer in World War II.

Life
Becker was born in Neuteich, Danzig (today Nowy Staw, Poland) to a German family. In 1936, aged 13, she joined the League of German Girls. In 1938, she became a tramway conductor in Danzig. In 1940, she began working for the Dokendorf firm in Neuteich, where she was employed until 1941, when she became an agriculture assistant in Danzig.

Camps
In 1944, the SS needed more guards at the nearby Stutthof concentration camp, and Becker was called up for service. She arrived at Stutthof on 5 September 1944 to begin training as an SS Aufseherin, or overseer. She later worked in the Stutthof SK-III women's camp, personally selecting (selektion) women and children for the gas chamber.

Post-war

  

After working in the camp for four months, Becker fled on 15 January 1945 and returned home to Neuteich. Three months later, on 13 April, Polish police arrested her and placed her in prison to await trial. 

The first Stutthof Trial began in Danzig on 31 May 1946, with five former SS women and several kapos as defendants. Becker, along with ten other defendants, was found guilty and sentenced to death. She had confessed to selecting at least 30 female prisoners to be gassed, but later retracted her confession. 

Becker sent several letters to Polish president Bolesław Bierut requesting that her sentence be commuted. The court had recommended that Becker's sentence be commuted to 15 years on the grounds that her actions had not been as severe as those of co-defendants Gerda Steinhoff or Jenny-Wanda Barkmann. Becker had been at the camp for the shortest amount of time. No pardon was issued, and she was publicly hanged on 4 July 1946 at Biskupia Górka along with the ten other condemned SS supervisors and kapos.

In popular culture
 In the play Maidens, written and directed by Kenley Smith, Becker is portrayed by Megan Dianne DeWald.

See also
 Female guards in Nazi concentration camps

References

1923 births
1946 deaths
Holocaust perpetrators in Poland
People from Nowy Staw
People from the Free City of Danzig
Naturalized citizens of Germany
Female guards in Nazi concentration camps
Stutthof trials executions
Executed German women
Executed people from Pomeranian Voivodeship
Filmed executions
Publicly executed people

People executed for crimes against humanity
Executed mass murderers